Neumann Prize may refer to:

 John von Neumann Theory Prize, awarded by the Institute for Operations Research and the Management Sciences and named after John von Neumann
 Neumann Prize, awarded by the British Society for the History of Mathematics and named after Peter M. Neumann

Disambiguation pages